Chasin' the Bird is a live album by Miles Davis released in 2000.

Track listing

 "Birth of the Cool Theme" (Gil Evans)
 "Introduction - Chasin' the Bird"
 "Move" (Denzil Best)
 "Why Do I Love You?" (Oscar Hammerstein II, Jerome Kern)
 "Godchild" (George Wallington)
 "Introduction - Chasin' the Bird"
 "S'il Vous Plait" (John Lewis)
 "Moon Dreams" (Chummy MacGregor, Johnny Mercer)
 "Budo (Hallucinations)" (Miles Davis, Bud Powell)
 "Darn That Dream" (Eddie DeLange, James Van Heusen)
 "Move"
 "Moon Dreams"
 "Budo (Hallucinations)"
 "52nd Street Theme" (Thelonious Monk)
 "Half Nelson" (Miles Davis)
 "You Go to My Head" (J. Fred Coots, Haven Gillespie)
 "Chasin' the Bird" (Charlie Parker)

Personnel 
Miles Davis - trumpet
Kenny "Pancho" Hagood - vocals
Lee Konitz - alto saxophone
Al McKibbon - Bass
Gerry Mulligan - tenor saxophone
Max Roach - drums

See also
List of jazz contrafacts

References 

Miles Davis live albums
2000 live albums